Rat torture is the use of rats to torture a victim by encouraging them to attack and eat the victim alive.

History 
The "Rats Dungeon", or "Dungeon of the Rats", was a feature of the Tower of London alleged by Roman Catholic writers from the Elizabethan era. "A cell below high-water mark and totally dark" would draw in rats from the River Thames as the tide flowed in. Prisoners would have their "alarm excited", and in some instances have "flesh ... torn from the arms and legs".

During the Dutch Revolt, Diederik Sonoy, an ally of William the Silent, is documented to have used a method where a pottery bowl filled with rats was placed open side down on the naked body of a prisoner. When hot charcoal was piled on the bowl, the rats would "gnaw into the very bowels of the victim" in an attempt to escape the heat.

Rat torture appears in the famous case study of a patient of Sigmund Freud. The Rat Man obsessed that his father and lady friend would be subjected to this torture.

Rat torture was used by several South American military dictatorships: in Brazil during the military dictatorship of 1964–1985, in Uruguay during the civic-military dictatorship of 1973–1985, in Chile during the dictatorship of Augusto Pinochet (1973–1990), and in Argentina during the period of the National Reorganization Process (1976–1983). The report of CONADEP in Argentina detailed the use of a torture method known as "the recto-scope" (reserved primarily for Jewish prisoners) which consisted of inserting living rats into a victim's rectum or vagina through a tube. Amnesty International documented the case of a woman tortured by the Chilean CNI (National Information Center, successor to the DINA) in 1981, who described being kept in a room full of live rats during interrogation.

Serial killer Richard Kuklinski alleged in a series of interviews that one of his preferred methods of murder was to tie up a victim and leave them in a cave overnight so they could be eaten alive by rats. He would also leave a Super 8 camera in the cave to film the events. Like many of Kuklinski's other claims, this has been disputed due to a lack of evidence.

On October 16, 2010 in Lakewood, New Jersey, David Wax was alleged to have threatened kidnap victim Yisrael Bryskman with rat torture unless he agreed to give his wife a get (Jewish divorce document). He was sentenced to seven years imprisonment for assisting in a kidnapping.

In fiction 
Rats are featured in the Edgar Allan Poe story The Pit and the Pendulum. The narrator lies on the rack, and can only watch as a scythe swings back and forth, approaching closer each time, as rats swarm over his body. The narrator later manages to make the rats eat through the straps.

An account similar to the Sonoy torture appears in the 1899 Octave Mirbeau novel The Torture Garden, and psychologist Leonard Shengold has identified this as the possible source of the story that the Rat Man told Freud. Part of the book, an imaginary dialog between a torturer and a beautiful woman who is sexually excited by the accounts, is set in China.

The threat of rat torture occurs in Nineteen Eighty-Four. The central character, Winston Smith, is arrested by the Ministry of Love, and undergoes a process of mental reprogramming. The ministry imprisons him in Room 101 to finalize the reprogramming. Here Winston must face his greatest fear: rats. A cage filled with hungry rats is placed over his head, their only source of food or escape being by eating their way through Winston's face. At this point Winston breaks and begs that the method actually be used on his lover Julia, a sign that he has finally been broken.

In Bret Easton Ellis's novel American Psycho, Patrick Bateman inserts a starving rat into a kidnapped woman's vagina through a pipe.

In the 2003 film 2 Fast 2 Furious, sequel to The Fast and The Furious, the main antagonist Carter Verone (Cole Hauser) uses rat torture to force a detective to allow his men to conduct their criminal enterprises unimpeded. He places a rat on to the detectives stomach and encapsulates it inside a metal bucket. He then begins to heat the bucket using a blow torch in order to cause the rat stress, prompting it to try to escape. The rat, with no alternative, begins to scratch the detective's stomach as it tries to burrow in order to escape the increasing heat inside the bucket. Once the detective agrees to Verone's demands, the bucket is removed, revealing an array of deep, bloody scratch marks.

Season 2 of the HBO dark fantasy series Game of Thrones from 2012 also uses rat torture by the Tickler on prisoners of Gregor Clegane in Harrenhal.

In the horror film Sinister 2, a snuff film titled "Sunday Service" depicts a family nailed to the floor of a church as rats are placed upon their bellies before cups are tied on top to keep the rats in place. Hot coals are then placed on top of the cups, encouraging the rats to burrow through the victims' chests to escape the heat.

In the film The Batman, the Riddler livestreams himself killing crooked Commissioner Pete Savage by strapping a device to Savage's head that forced rats from a maze to burrow their way into his face.

See also
 List of torture methods and devices

References

External links
 Commentary on rat torture with a translation of an extract from Le Jardin des supplices by Octave Mirbeau.

Torture
Rats
Nineteen Eighty-Four